Samuel McClure (11 February 1878–1906) was an English footballer who played in the Football League for Blackburn Rovers.

References

1878 births
1906 deaths
English footballers
Association football defenders
English Football League players
Blackburn Rovers F.C. players